Diarsia nigrosigna is a moth of the family Noctuidae. It is found in the north-eastern parts of the Himalaya, from China to Sundaland, the Philippines and Sulawesi.

External links
 Species info

Diarsia
Moths described in 1881